Albuca fastigiata is a plant species in the genus Albuca native to the Cape Provinces of South Africa, where it is used in ethnomedicine.

A homoisoflavanone can be found in A. fastigiata.

References 

fastigiata
Flora of the Cape Provinces